Susumu Yokota was a Japanese electronic music composer. He released under many aliases, often switching between different aliases for different record labels.

Susumu Yokota
Albums
 Acid Mt. Fuji (1994)
 Magic Thread (1998)
 1998 (1998)
 Image 1983-1998 (1998)
 1999 (1999)
 Sakura (1999)
 Mix (1999)
 Zero (2000)
 Zero Remixes (2001)
 Grinning Cat (2001)
 Will (2001)
 Sound of Sky (2002)
 The Boy and the Tree (2002)
 Over Head (2003)
 Laputa (2003)
 Baroque (2004)
 Symbol (2004)
 Wonder Waltz (2006)
 Triple Time Dance (2006)
 Love or Die (2007)
 Mother (2009)
 Kaleidoscope (2010)
 Dreamer (2012)

EPs
 Mix (2000)
 Zero Remixes EP Vol. 1 (2000)
 Zero Remixes EP Vol. 2 (2001)
 Zero Remixes EP Vol. 3 (2001)
 Arm (2002)

Singles
 Blood of Angel (1998)
 Future Memory (1999)
 Come on My World (2000)
 Could Heaven Ever Be Like This (2001)
 King of Darkness (2002)
 Rainbow Flag (2003)

Compilation
 Skintone Collection (2007)

Anima Mundi
Albums
 Anima Beat (1996)
EPs
 Nebula (1996)

Ebi
Albums
 Zen (1994)
 Ten (1995)
EPs
 Hi (1993)
 Liveacid (1994)
 Fat Shrimp (1995)

Prism
Albums
 Metronome Melody (1995)
 Fallen Angel (1997)
EPs
 Metronome Melody (1996)
 Fallen Angel Club Mix (1997)

Ringo
Albums
 Plantation (1995)

Stevia
Albums
 Fruits of the Room (1997)
 Greenpeace (1998)

Yin & Yang
EPs
 A Magic Cap in the Sky (1994)
 Grand (1997)

Yokota
Albums
 Frankfurt Tokyo Connection (1993)
 Cat, Mouse and Me (1996)
 Psychic Dance (2009)

Singles
 Panicwaves (1994)
 Wait for a Day (1997)
 One Way (1997)

246
EPs
 Vol. 1 (1994)
 Vol. 2 (1995)

with Rothko
Albums
 Distant Sounds of Summer (2005)
EPs
 Waters Edge (2002)

Discographies of Japanese artists
Pop music discographies